Carlos García Quesada may refer to:
Carlos García Quesada (cyclist) (born 1978), Spanish retired road racing cyclist
Carlos García Quesada (footballer) (born 1993), Spanish football midfielder